Lewis Brook (27 July 1918 – 1996) was a professional footballer who played as a defender for Halifax Town, Huddersfield Town & Oldham Athletic. He grew up in Northowram, near Halifax in the West Riding of Yorkshire.

References

1918 births
1996 deaths
Association football midfielders
English Football League players
English footballers
Footballers from Halifax, West Yorkshire
Halifax Town A.F.C. players
Huddersfield Town A.F.C. players
Oldham Athletic A.F.C. players
Watford F.C. wartime guest players